William Archer  (6 May 1830 (1827?) – 14 August 1897) was an Irish naturalist and microscopist especially interested in Protozoa and Desmids.

Life
He was born in Magherahamlet, County Down, the eldest son of Rev Richard Archer, vicar of Clonduff.

He was one of the twelve founder (1849) members of the Dublin Microscopical Club. Between 1858 and 1885 he wrote over 230 scientific papers in the Quarterly Journal of Microscopical Science, Proceedings of the Natural History Society of Dublin, the vast majority are short notes on desmids collected in Ireland. Sometimes the same article was published in two or more journals.

He was a Member of the Dublin University Zoological Association and was elected a Fellow of the Royal Society in 1875.

He was appointed Librarian of the National Library of Ireland from 1877 to 1895.

References

Further reading
Anon, 1898 Proc. Roy. Soc., Vol. 62 (1897 - 1898) Obituary.
Anon? 1897 . Irish Naturalist 6, 253 Portrait
Prescott G.W., 1984 Bibliographia Desmidiacearum Universalis (A Contribution to a Bibliography of Desmid Systematics, Biology and Ecology from 1774-1982). Koeltz Scientific Books, Koenigstein. 612 pp. Full list of papers on desmids.

External links
NBG

19th-century births
1897 deaths
Irish naturalists
Irish librarians
Fellows of the Royal Society